Yunshan Road is a station on Shanghai Metro Line 6 and Line 14. It began operation on 29 December 2007. It later became an interchange station on 30 December 2021 when Line 14 opened. It is located at the junction of Yunshan Road and Zhangyang Road.
Like all other stations on Line 6, it is located in Shanghai's Pudong New Area.

Station Layout

References 

Railway stations in Shanghai
Shanghai Metro stations in Pudong
Railway stations in China opened in 2007
Line 6, Shanghai Metro
Line 14, Shanghai Metro